Arthur Vincent "Pop" Williams (May 4, 1906 – February 6, 1979) was an American football back who played five seasons in the National Football League with the Providence Steam Roller and Brooklyn Dodgers. He played college football at the University of Connecticut and attended Killingly High School in Killingly, Connecticut.

References

External links
Just Sports Stats

1906 births
1979 deaths
People from Griswold, Connecticut
Players of American football from Connecticut
American football running backs
American football defensive backs
UConn Huskies football players
Providence Steam Roller players
Brooklyn Dodgers (NFL) players
People from Jewett City, Connecticut